The Kambagiri Swamy temple is located in Peapully Mandal, surrounding villages are Uppala Padu, Nereducheralla, Burugula, Boincheruvu palli and Racherla.Dhone Taluk in the Kurnool district of Andhra Pradesh. Kambagiri swamy is very powerful Hindu god.  The way to reach the temple is to reach Dronachellam (Dhone) by train and then take a bus to Kommemarri or Boorugula to reach the village Racherla. There is a Ghat road to the temple from Racherla. Lord Vishnu appears in the form of a varanus here.  He is popularly known as Kambagiri Rama and Kambagiri Lakshmi Narasimha Swamy.In summer, there is a huge water problem and it is very hot. Every year on the full moon day of Chatra (15 days after Ugadi), a Tirunnalla takes place which is attended by lakhs of devotees. Special government buses run to aid the devotees. Kambagiri Swami brothers are 7.

Brothers:

 Lord Venkateswara Swami aka Balaji, aka Tirumala Vasa aka Srinivasa, 
 Lakshmi narasimha swamy
 Pedda Obulesu
 Chinna Obulesu
 Pedda Maddileti swami
 Chinna Maddileti Swami

Kambagiri swami is an archaic poetic way of describing Lord NaraSimha Swami and he has two wives - Sadda Lakkama and Sadda Lakshmamma. Devotees believe that their prayers and desires come true in a short span.

In erra malla forest the temple is very cute full showing and every moon lite temple showing very colourful.  In dhone Bus Stand Kommamuri Bus, or racharla, or Yadiki or Banaganapalli buses are going on this route.

Kurnool Dt. Banaganapalli bus you should debus in Garladinne bus stop. change bus or other travel direct kambagiri swami temple.

Kurnool Dt. From Banganapalli bus stand you go Dhone bus or Peapully bus through Garladinne. again change bus or other travel direct kambagiri swami temple.

Anantapur Dt. From Yadiki you go on burgula bus or racharla or garladenne bus.

Presently this temple is maintaining Kurnool Dt. Owk village Chella Rama Krishna Reddy and families. This temple Pujari is Madhu swami.

Chella Rama Krishna Reddy garu Present Koilakuntla Segment Congress MLA in Andhra Pradesh.

We will update coming days, Kambagiri swami total story.

From Hyderabad it is nearly 350 kilometres, another shortcut route is from owk to uppalpadu buses are available from there it is near so many devotees going by walk it is accent route, in long back

Hindu temples in Kurnool district